The men's high jump event at the 2023 European Athletics Indoor Championships will be held on 3 March at 19:00 (qualification) and 5 March at 19:05 (final) local time.

Medalists

Records

Results

Qualification 
Qualification: Qualifying performance 2.26 (Q) or at least 8 best performers (q) advance to the Final.

Final

References 

2023 European Athletics Indoor Championships
High jump at the European Athletics Indoor Championships